Kirk Hyslop (born May 1, 1889, date of death unknown) was an architect in Toronto, Ontario, Canada. He was born May 1, 1889, in Ontario.

Hyslop designed at least two Toronto buildings which have since been designated as historical structures.  One is the Windsor Arms Hotel, a neo-gothic structure built in 1927  The other is the La Plaza Theater, built in 1909 and altered in 1932, although it is not clear whether he was involved in the initial design or the alterations.

Works

References

1889 births
Canadian architects
Year of death missing